Jan Sobol (born 21 June 1953) is a Polish footballer. He played in two matches for the Poland national football team from 1977 to 1979.

References

External links
 

1953 births
Living people
Polish footballers
Poland international footballers
Place of birth missing (living people)
Association footballers not categorized by position